is a professional Japanese baseball player. He plays pitcher for the Yokohama DeNA BayStars.

He was selected . On October 10, 2018, he was selected Japan national baseball team at the 2018 MLB Japan All-Star Series, but on October 18, 2018, he canceled his participation for Samurai Japan.

References

External links

 NPB.com

1995 births
Living people
Japanese baseball players
Nippon Professional Baseball pitchers
Ritsumeikan University alumni
Baseball people from Mie Prefecture
Yokohama DeNA BayStars players
Nippon Professional Baseball Rookie of the Year Award winners